Patchen Pass (historically Cuesta de Los Gatos and also locally referred to as "the Summit") is a low mountain pass through the Santa Cruz Mountains of California, connecting the Santa Clara Valley to Santa Cruz and the Pacific coast. California State Route 17 traverses the pass at the Santa Clara–Santa Cruz county line, just south where the highway intersects with California State Route 35.

Description
Patchen Pass lies on the border between Santa Clara County to the north of the pass, and Santa Cruz County to the south. It is traversed by California State Route 17, which runs from north to south through the pass, and is the eastern terminus of California State Route 35, which runs along the ridgeline to the west the pass and continues to the east as Summit Road. Amenities at the pass include a restaurant on one side of Highway 17, and a convenience store and marijuana dispensary on the other side.

History
In the 18th century, a trail across the pass formed part of the historic El Camino Real connecting Mission Santa Clara de Asís with Mission Santa Cruz, likely along a route followed earlier by Native Americans. Lakes near the summit made the place a popular fishing and swimming spot until the 1906 San Francisco earthquake caused them to dry up. In 1940, State Route 17 replaced the Soquel San Jose Road through the pass; the old alignment still crosses the pass, a short distance to the east of State Route 17, as the Old Santa Cruz Highway. A Southern Pacific passenger train line through the pass, from Los Gatos to Olympia, opened in 1880 but closed again after storms in early 1940 caused mudslides and washouts on the line.

Name
The pass was historically called Cuesta de Los Gatos (Spanish for "Wildcat Ridge") by John C. Frémont, but the same name may refer more generally to that part of the Santa Cruz Mountains. The pass itself was renamed to Patchen Pass in the 1970s by several local government bodies, at the instigation of local politician Albert B. Smith and over the objections of local historians. The name "Patchen" comes from the nearby ghost town of Patchen; in turn, the town of Patchen may have been named after a famous race horse, or possibly after the activity of sewing patches on clothes. Locally, the pass is more often referred to as "the Summit" than by either of its official names. Alternatively, taking the route over the pass is called going "over the hill".

References

Mountain passes of California
Transportation in Santa Clara County, California
Transportation in Santa Cruz County, California